The 1972 Virginia Slims of Denver, also known as the Virginia Slims Denver International,  was a women's tennis tournament played on hard court at the South High School in Denver, Colorado in the United States that was part of the 1972 WT Pro Tour. It was the inaugural edition of the tournament and was held from August 14 through August 20, 1972. Third-seeded Nancy Richey Gunter won the singles title and earned $6,000 first-prize money.

Finals

Singles
 Nancy Richey Gunter defeated  Billie Jean King 1–6, 6–4, 6–4

Doubles
 Françoise Dürr /  Lesley Hunt defeated  Helen Gourlay /  Karen Krantzcke 6–0, 6–3

Prize money

See also
 1972 Denver WCT

References

Virginia Slims of Denver
Virginia Slims of Denver
Virgin
Virginia Slims of Denver
Virginia Slims of Denver